To Yuen Wai is a village in Lam Tei, Tuen Mun District, Hong Kong.

Administration
To Yuen Wai is a recognized village under the New Territories Small House Policy. It is one of the 36 villages represented within the Tuen Mun Rural Committee.

References

External links

 Delineation of area of existing village Tsing Shan Tsuen (Tuen Mun) for election of resident representative (2019 to 2022)

Villages in Tuen Mun District, Hong Kong
Lam Tei